Benjamin Maund (1790–1863) was a British pharmacist, botanist, printer, bookseller, fellow of the Linnean Society (1827) and publisher of the Botanic Garden and The Botanist. He served on the committee of the Worcestershire Natural History Society where he started a monthly botanical publication.

Starting in 1825, Maund produced The Botanic Garden from his press at Bromsgrove in Worcestershire. The 13 volumes of this periodical depicted with great delicacy ornamental flowering plants cultivated in the Royal Gardens and was dedicated to the young Queen Victoria. Eminent botanical artists such as Augusta Innes Withers, Edwin D. Smith, Mrs. Edward Bury and Maund's own daughter contributed to the work. The work was published by Baldwin, Cradock & Joy of London.  A special 'Crown Edition' of the work was also published in which each page depicted a single species rather than four to a page as in the first edition. Each page had a decorative border topped by a crown. Issued as a supplement to The Botanic Garden were 70 numbered prints under the title of The Fruitist. Each of these was a hand-coloured engraving and description of a particular fruit.

Five volumes of lavish hand-coloured illustrations were issued, Augusta Innes Withers once more being the most important botanical artist to contribute. The plates were engraved by S Watts, Nevitt & Smith.

List of selected works

References

External links
Maund, Benjamin (1825) The Botanic Garden - digital facsimile from the Linda Hall Library. Two high-resolution images from this volume can be found here.

British botanists
British printers
British publishers (people)
1790 births
1863 deaths
19th-century British businesspeople